Thomas Joseph (8 June 1954 – 29 July 2021) was an Indian writer of Malayalam literature. He received Kerala Sahitya Akademi Award for Story in 2013 for his work, Marichavar Cinema KaanukayaaNu (The Dead are Watching Movies). He was also a recipient of SBT Literary Award, Delhi Short Story Award, K. A. Kodungallore Award, V. P. Sivakumar memorial Keli Award and the Children's literary institute Award. He died on 29 July 2021, at the age of 67.

Biography 
Thomas Joseph was born on 8 June 1954, in Eloor, an industrial town in Ernakulam district of the south Indian state of Kerala to Thomas Vadaykkal and Mary Vellayil. He wrote his first short story when he was a 5th standard student and started publishing stories in Malayalam weeklies during his high school and college period. He published his first collection of short stories, Athbhuta-samasya, in 1989. His Chitra-salabhangalude Kappal (The Ship of Butterflies), short stories collection, was awarded the SBT Literary Award in 1996. His story "Athbhuta-samasya", was published in the magazine Saketam, under the editorialship of Narendra Prasad and V. P. Sivakumar. He published eight books, which include six collections of short stories.

Death 
Thomas Joseph worked at Chandrika and Indian Express daily newspapers and in Pen books.  Towards the latter part of his life, he resided at Keezhmad, Aluva and it was here, he suffered a massive stroke while asleep on 15 September 2018, due to which he was admitted to Rajagiri hospital in Kalamassery. Due to limited financial resources, his family could not afford the expenses of the medical treatment and his friends and fellow writers resorted to crowd funding to raise the required money. Though later discharged, he stayed in a coma for around three years before his death at his home on 29 July 2021, aged 67.

Awards and honors 
Thomas Joseph received Mrigaya magazine’s ‘Mrigaya Award-1984’ through the Readers’ Gallop poll. He was also the recipient of Delhi Short Story Award, K. A. Kodungallore Award (1995), V. P. Sivakumar memorial Keli Award (2003) and the Children's literary institute Award (2009). His short story collection, Marichavar cinema kaaNukayaaNu (The Dead are Watching Movies) received the Kerala Sahitya Akademi Award for Story in 2013.

Bibliography

Novels

Short story anthologies

References

Further reading

External links 
 
 
 

1954 births
2021 deaths
Writers from Kerala
People from Aluva
20th-century Indian short story writers
20th-century Indian novelists
Malayali people
Malayalam novelists
Malayalam short story writers
Malayalam-language writers
Indian male novelists
Indian male short story writers
21st-century Indian novelists
21st-century Indian short story writers